Journal of Mathematical Biology is a peer-reviewed, mathematics journal,  published by Springer Verlag. Founded in 1974, the journal publishes articles on mathematical biology. In particular, papers published in this journal 'should either provide biological insight as a result of mathematical analysis or identify and open up challenging new types of mathematical problems that derive from biological knowledge'. It is the official journal of the European Society for Mathematical and Theoretical Biology. The editors-in-chief are Thomas Hillen, Anna Marciniak-Czochra, and Mark Lewis.

Its 2020 impact factor is 2.259.

Abstracting and indexing
This journal is indexed in the following databases:

Thomson Reuters
 BIOSIS
 Biological Abstracts
 Current Contents / Life Sciences
 Journal Citation Reports
 Science Citation Index Expanded
 Zoological Record
 PubMed/Medline (Web of Knowledge)
Gale
 Academic OneFile
 Expanded Academic
EBSCO host
 Academic Search
 EBSCO
NAL Catalog
 AGRICOLA
CAB Direct
 CAB Abstracts
 Global Health
American Chemical Society
 Chemical Abstracts Service
Elsevier
 EMBASE
 EMBiology
Other databases
 Current Index to Statistics
 Digital Mathematics Registry
 Google Scholar
 IBIDS
 International Bibliography of Periodical Literature (IBZ)
 Mathematical Reviews
 OCLC
 SCOPUS
 Summon by Serial Solutions
 VINITI - Russian Academy of Science
 Zentralblatt Math

References

External links
European Society for Mathematical and Theoretical Biology (ESMTB)

Mathematical and theoretical biology journals
Publications established in 1974
English-language journals
Springer Science+Business Media academic journals
Monthly journals